Luanshya District is a district of Zambia, located in Copperbelt Province. The capital lies at Luanshya. As of the 2000 Zambian census, the district had a population of 147,908 people.

References

Districts of Copperbelt Province
Luanshya